Hojambaz or Hodzhambas is a city and capital of Hojambaz District in Lebap Province, Turkmenistan.

Etymology
In Persian, the name of the city means "warrior" although it has undergone some phonetic modification. On 19th-century Russian maps of the area, the name was annotated as  Ходжа-Джамбас (Hodzha-Dzhambas) and Ходжа-Джумбус (Khodja-Dzhumbus), and in the 1926 documents demarcating the Turkmen SSR as Ходжа-Джанбаз (Khodzha-Dzhanbas). Yakup Astanakulow TOP TKM

Economy
The city's economy is dominated by employment at the China National Petroleum Company natural gas works in the Bagtyýarlyk gas field. The surrounding Hojambaz District produces cotton, which is ginned in the city.

References

Populated places in Lebap Region